Microphysa may refer to:
 Microphysa (plant), a genus of plants in the family Rubiaceae
 Microphysa, a genus of plants in the family Melastomataceae, synonym of Tococa
 Microphysa, a genus of butterflies in the family Erebidae, synonym of Eublemma
 Microphysa, a genus of gastropods in the family Sagdidae, synonym of Hojeda